ReadCube is a technology company developing software for researchers, publishers, academic and commercial organizations. ReadCube's product line includes the reference manager ReadCube Papers, Anywhere Access and custom services for publishers. It is part of the Digital Science's portfolio.

The ReadCube Papers app suite is under development based on the original ReadCube and Papers applications. It is currently available as a web-based platform (Web App) and on Mobile operating systems iOS and Android. The page has announced that the desktop applications should be ready to launch Fall 2019. The legacy ReadCube and Papers applications are no longer actively developed.

The original ReadCube desktop application was available for free, selling premium services such as storage on the online library. In contrast, Papers was a software sold for a one time payment. ReadCube Papers is now a yearly subscription-based model.

History

ReadCube was created by Labtiva, a Boston-based company. A desktop client was publicly launched in October 2011 with investment from Digital Science, a division of Macmillan Publishers. Shortly after, ReadCube Web Reader was integrated with the website of Nature in November 2011. A pilot program for ReadCube Access was launched at the University of Utah in September 2012, followed by a public release on Nature Publishing Group journals in November 2012. Also in November 2012, version 2.0 of the Web Reader launched with a number of significant changes.
In February 2013, ReadCube launched across over 117 journals published by Wiley.

In April 2014, Labtiva released ReadCube Pro and with it a new UI with several new features.  Some of these features, including SmartCite - ReadCube's citation and bibliography formatting tool, the inclusion of multiple highlighting colors, and several view options come for free with the new update.  A few, including a cloud sync function which allows PDF (.pdf) files to be synced across desktop machines or to the ReadCube iPad app, a metrics pane that shows where an article is being spoken about online, and a "Watched Folders" feature that automatically imports and indexes PDFs come only with ReadCube Pro.

On 2 December 2014, Nature announced that it would allow its subscribers and a group of selected media outlets to distribute links providing limited "free" access to articles from its journals through ReadCube Web Reader. While it does, to an extent, provide free online access to articles, it is not a true open access scheme due to its restrictions on users' ability to download, copy, print, or otherwise distribute the content.

On March 16, 2016, ReadCube acquired Papers from Springer Nature for an undisclosed amount.

Researcher products

Papers (software) available for Mac, Windows, iOS and Android.

Papers was purchased by ReadCube in March 2016. The release of the new Papers after the merger became available on the web and mobile apps on November 1, 2018. The desktop version (for Mac and Windows) was released in the Fall of 2019.

Features include:

 Search & Download
 Built-in search engines
 Personalized recommendations
 Related article feeds
 Institutional proxy support
 Web importing via browser
 1-click PDF downloads
 Advanced search filters
 Organizational Management
 Easy importing tools from your desktop/other reference managers
 Auto article meta-data matching
 Full text library search
 Advanced sorted & filtering
 Manual & smart collections
 #keyword tagging, labels & article ratings
 Enhanced reading and annotating
 Enhanced PDF viewing
 Hyperlinked inline references, high-res figure browsers & auto-fetched supplements
 Advanced article metrics (incl. citations, field & relative citation ratio, and Altmetric)
 Inline and sticky notes, highlighting and drawing tools
 Text to speech tool
 Collaboration
 Up to 5 private shared collections (PDFs/references)
 Collaborate with up to 30 Papers users per collection
 Share references, PDFs, notes, tags and PDF annotations
 Article discussion summary
 Citation Tools - SmartCite
 Insert references from personal / shared libraries or use built-in search engine
 8000+ citation styles supported. Customize & import your own
 Quick-copy of citations in bibtex, ris
 Export reference list for use in third party citation tools like EndNote and Overleaf
 Supports Word 2016+ and Google Docs
 Cross-platform syncing
 Unlimited cloud storage for your personal library
 Sync your entire library including notes, lists, annotations, and highlights across all of your devices
 Supports Desktop (Mac/PC), mobile (iOS/Android) and Web.

ReadCube (legacy) previously available for Windows and macOS.
 Consolidated display of all imported articles into a library
 Customizable lists to organize articles
 Integrated search functionality with Google Scholar, PubMed, and Microsoft Academic to find and download new research material
 Personalized recommendations of literature based on searches and library content
 PDF viewer with notes and text highlighting
 Supplements and references in one place
 Full-text search across your entire PDF library
 Hyperlinked references
 Easily export citations to EndNote and other reference managers
 Can sync your library between multiple devices
 Can manually add and edit citation data
 Can watch specific folders for changes & automatically import PDFs
 SmartCite allows users to format citations and create bibliographies

Publisher custom solutions 
ReadCube Enhanced PDF, available on nature.com for articles published by Nature Publishing Group, Frontiers and John Wiley & Sons and any articles uploaded into the ReadCube Papers cloud.

 Optimized PDF Viewing
 Clickable in-line references with direct links to articles
 Integrated view of the supplement, associated news, and editor's comments
 DOI lookup allows users to navigate directly to articles
 Includes a ReadCube Papers Web Extension, which sends articles from web browsers directly to the Papers library
 Draw, highlight and take notes
Full Reference List
Figure Browser

ReadCube Checkout

ReadCube Checkout is a service that offers rental, cloud and downloadable article access options outside journal subscriptions. This checkout functionality is offered for the majority of journal articles on several publisher pages. Individual readers make the choice to select the level of access that best fits their needs.

Notes and references

See also
 Comparison of reference management software
 Nature Publishing Group
 Metadata discovery

Reference management software